The East Williston Union Free School District is a school district that serves all of East Williston and parts of Roslyn Heights, Albertson, Mineola, and Old Westbury in central Nassau County, New York.

About the district
The district superintendent is Dr. Elaine Kanas. The central administration office is located at 11 Bacon Road, Old Westbury, New York 11568.

Schools in the District 

 North Side Elementary School (Grades K - 4)
110 East Williston Avenue, Williston Park, NY 11596
 Willets Road Middle School (Grades 5-7)
455 I.U. Willets Road, Roslyn Heights, NY 11577
 The Wheatley School (Grades 8-12)
11 Bacon Road, Old Westbury, NY 11568

Sports 
Wheatley features many sports and extracurricular teams and clubs. The football and lacrosse teams are shared with the neighboring Carle Place School District.

References

External links
 

Mineola, New York
Education in Nassau County, New York
School districts in New York (state)